John Mee (3 May 1824 in Nottingham – 19 September 1883 in Fort William) was the inaugural Dean of Grahamstown in South Africa.

He was educated at Christ's College, Cambridge and ordained in 1849. His first post was a curacy at All Saints, Derby. He was the incumbent at Riddings from 1850 to 1854 when he went with the CMS to South Africa. On his return to England he was at St Jude, Southwark from 1864 to 1871; and after that St John the Baptist's Church, Westbourne from then until his death.

Notes 
Footnotes

Citations

References 

 

1824 births
People from Nottingham
Alumni of Christ's College, Cambridge
Deans of Grahamstown
1883 deaths
19th-century South African Anglican priests